The Mortgage Bankers Association (MBA) is the United States national association representing all facets of the real estate finance industry. Headquartered in Washington, D.C., MBA represents over 2,200 member companies. MBA’s membership base includes all sectors of the real estate finance industry including originators, servicers, underwriters, compliance personnel and information technology professionals representing mortgage companies in the residential, commercial and multi-family arenas.

During the subprime mortgage crisis of 2008, the MBA's membership fell from 3,000 to 2,500. Its current membership is 2,200.

MBA is headed by Robert Broeksmit, president and chief executive officer. Rodrigo Lopez, executive chairman of NorthMarq Capital, is MBA's chairman for 2017.

Lobbying
The Mortgage Bankers Association has a political action committee called Mortgage Bankers Association Political Action Committee (MORPAC). MORPAC raises money to help elect and re-elect candidates to Congress who have an understanding of the real estate finance and housing industries, and who are supportive of the mortgage profession. The lobbying group is headed by Bill Killmer, Senior Vice President of Legislative and Political Affairs.

Education
The MBA offers training and continuing education to mortgage professionals. It is also active in educating consumers.

CampusMBA 
CampusMBA is the MBA's education division. CampusMBA offers programs in various formats, including distance learning, live online workshops, classroom-based courses, corporate training and several books and other resources.

CampusMBA offers industry certifications and designations, including the following:

Certified Mortgage Banker (CMB)
Accredited Mortgage Professional (AMP)
Certified Loan Officer (CLO)
Certified Mortgage Servicer (CMS)
Certified Residential Underwriter (CRU)

School of Mortgage Banking 
Since 1948, the MBA has been offering courses through The School of Mortgage Banking (SOMB) to the real estate finance community. SOMB is a series of three four-day courses, now administered by CampusMBA, the educational division of MBA created in 2000. The courses offer comprehensive instruction in specific aspects of the mortgage banking industry. Graduates of SOMB receive the Accredited Mortgage Professional (AMP) designation upon successful completion of the courses.

Home Loan Learning Center 
The Home Loan Learning Center is a consumer education website providing financial literacy information on credit reports and scores, the true cost of owning a home and how to compare the costs of owning versus renting a home. The site includes information on how to qualify for a loan, what the documents mean, what's included in the mortgage payment. It also has mortgage calculators to help consumers plan their payments.

MISMO 
The Mortgage Industry Standards Maintenance Organization (MISMO), a nonprofit subsidiary of the MBA, is the leading technology standards development body for residential and commercial industry. MISMO promotes data consistency throughout the broader industry, reduces processing costs, increases transparency, and boosts investor confidence in mortgages as an asset class, while passing cost savings on to the consumer.

Default on headquarters loan 
In October 2009, the MBA sold its headquarters in Washington, D.C., for $41.3 million to CoStar Group. It had originally purchased the building in 2007 for $79 million, $75 million of which was financed from a group of banks headed by PNC Financial Services. It now rents offices nearby.

The association was criticized for defaulting on its mortgage despite saying that there's a moral obligation for homeowners to repay their mortgages.

The default was featured on The Daily Show on October 7, 2010, contrasting the MBA's actions with statements made by its representatives claiming that strategic default is morally wrong. MBA operatives refused to make a comment.

Footnotes

Trade associations based in the United States
Banking in the United States
Mortgage industry companies of the United States
Mortgage industry associations